Phyllomacromia bispina is a species of dragonfly in the family Corduliidae. It is found in the Republic of the Congo, the Democratic Republic of the Congo, Uganda, and Zambia. Its natural habitats are subtropical or tropical moist lowland forests and rivers. It is threatened by habitat loss.

References

Corduliidae
Taxonomy articles created by Polbot